Marbo Product is a Serbian subsidiary of PepsiCo that manufactures, markets, and sells potato chips, and other snack foods. Its headquarters is in Belgrade, Serbia.

History
Marbo Product was founded on 16 April 1995, by Serbian businessmen Andrej Jovanović and Bojan Milovanović. In the beginning, Marbo Product had a factory in Maglić near Novi Sad, and in 2000 it opened another factory in Laktaši, Bosnia and Herzegovina, but it was closed in 2021. Throughout the years, Marbo Product emerged as a leader on the Serbian potato chip and snack food market. As of 2008, Marbo Product has facilities and distributive centers in several countries in the region – including: Albania, Croatia, Greece, Montenegro and North Macedonia.

In August 2008, Marbo Product was purchased by American multinational food, snack, and beverage corporation, PepsiCo, for €210 million.

References

External links
 

Serbian brands
Serbian companies established in 1995
Food and drink companies of Serbia
Food and drink companies established in 1995
Manufacturing companies based in Belgrade
2008 mergers and acquisitions
PepsiCo subsidiaries